Seán Moore (born 1934) was an Irish Gaelic footballer and athlete who played for club side Glenview, divisional side Seandún, at senior level with the Cork county team and with Munster. He usually lined out at midfield.

Career
Moore first came to prominence as a Gaelic footballer when he was selected for the Munster colleges team while a student at the North Monastery. After a brief stint with the Mitchels club in Castlebar, he subsequently joined the Glenview club also earned selection on the Seandún divisional team.  A brief period with the Cork junior team was followed by inclusion on the senior side in 1954. Moore enjoyed great success throughout the 1956–57 seasons, winning a National League medal and consecutive Munster Championship medals. The ultimate success eluded him as Cork suffered back-to-back All-Ireland final defeats to Galway and Louth. Moore was also a noted athlete and lifted the Irish decathlon title in 1958, as well as an All-Ireland title in basketball. A motorcycle accident in December 1958 brought a premature end to his football and athletic careers.

Personal life
Moore was born in Moneygall, County Offaly. The son of a Garda, the family moved to Cork when he was just six months old. After his education at the North Monastery, Moore spent a year working in the tax office in Castlebar. He returned to Cork and worked as an administrative officer with the ESB.

Honours
Cork
Munster Senior Football Championship: 1956, 1957
National Football League: 1955-56

References

1934 births
Living people
Castlebar Mitchels Gaelic footballers
ESB people
Glenview Gaelic footballers
Seandún Gaelic footballers
Cork inter-county Gaelic footballers
Munster inter-provincial Gaelic footballers
Gaelic games players from County Offaly